David Blair (born June 29, 1971) is an American former professional tennis player.

Blair played collegiate tennis for the University of Florida and won the NCAA Division I doubles championship with Mark Merklein in 1993. The pair received a wildcard into the doubles main draw of the 1993 US Open, falling in the second round to Patrick McEnroe and Richey Reneberg.

References

External links
 
 

1971 births
Living people
American male tennis players
Florida Gators men's tennis players
20th-century American people